Robert Lima may refer to:

 Robert Lima (poet) (born 1935), Cuban poet and academic
 Robert Lima (footballer) (1972-2021), Uruguayan footballer